The first USS Fearless (SP-724) was a United States Navy tug in commission from 1917 to 1921.

Fearless was built as a commercial steam fishing trawler of the same name in 1877. On 20 May 1917, the U.S. Navy acquired her for use during World War I. Assigned the section patrol number 724, she was commissioned as USS Fearless (SP-724) in 1917.

Assigned to the 4th Naval District, Fearless served for the rest of World War I as a tug in the Philadelphia, Pennsylvania, area. She apparently remained in naval service after the end of the war.

Fearless was sold on 30 September 1921.

References

SP-724 Fearless at Department of the Navy Naval History and Heritage Command Online Library of Selected Images: U.S. Navy Ships -- Listed by Hull Number "SP" #s and "ID" #s -- World War I Era Patrol Vessels and other Acquired Ships and Craft numbered from SP-700 through SP-799
NavSource Online: Section Patrol Craft Photo Archive Fearless (SP 724)

Auxiliary ships of the United States Navy
World War I auxiliary ships of the United States
1877 ships